Lake Ihotry is the second largest lake of Madagascar. It is a closed saline lake in semi-arid southwestern part of Madagascar in the region of Atsimo-Andrefana. Its area varies seasonally, from 96 km2 to 112 km2.

Roads
It can be reached by the RN9 from Toliara (Tulear) to Mandabe.

Citations

Other sources
 BirdLife
 Geophysical Research document

Ihotry
Atsimo-Andrefana
Important Bird Areas of Madagascar